Angel Cruchaga Santa María (March 23, 1893 – September 5, 1964) was a Chilean writer. He won the Chilean National Prize for Literature in 1948.

Works

Further reading 
 

1893 births
1964 deaths
Chilean male writers
National Prize for Literature (Chile) winners